Erock may refer to:

Bicycling
 Elephant Rock Ride, an annual bicycling event in Castle Rock, Colorado
 ErokIT, a 2008 motorised bicycle

People
 Eric Calderone (also known as "Erock"), American YouTuber and guitarist
 Eric Friedman (also known as "Erock") American heavy metal and rock musician